This is a list of when the first radio broadcasts to the public occurred in the mentioned countries and territories. Non-public field tests and closed circuit demonstrations are not referred to; neither are license dates or dates of the official opening.

Basis for each entry is the time of introduction. Listed are independent countries, dependent territories and territories within a country only if they became independent later or if it is a large country and there is a vast time difference with the introduction in different parts.

Each entry comprises: the flag linked to the country or territory, the name of the country or territory and, in parentheses, the designation of the radio station (either by call sign or by name, linked to a main article), its city and some additional information.

History

1910s and 1920s

1930s

1940s

1950s

1960s 1970s and 1990s

References

Bibliography
 Blin, Bernard. Milestones in radio: the first half century (1895–1945). The UNESCO courier (February 1997), p. 16–21
 Radio Review/Radio Listeners Guide (1925–1929), Broadcasting Yearbook (1935–2010), World Radio TV Handbook (1947–)
 Berg, Jerome S. The early shortwave stations: a broadcasting history through 1945 (2013)
 radioheritage.net
 worldradiomap.com (Europe, Americas, Asia, Oceania)
 Europe: Broadcasting abroad (1934);  (2004)
 Africa: Head, Sydney W.  (1974); Ziegler, Dhyana.  (1992)
 Arab world: Boyd, Douglas A.  (1982)
 Asia: Sterling, Christopher H. Encyclopedia of radio. Asia (2004); Luthra, H. R.  (1986); McDaniel, Drew O.  (1994)

See also
 History of radio
 Table of years in radio
 List of oldest radio stations
 Timeline of the introduction of television in countries

Radio
Introduction